Tung Tau Tsuen is a village in the Yuen Long Kau Hui area of Yuen Long District, Hong Kong.

Administration
Tung Tau Tsuen is a recognized village under the New Territories Small House Policy.

History
Tung Tau Tsuen is so called because it is located in the east of the old Yuen Long Kau Hui market. It was established in the 17th century by the members of several clans, the Chans being the major one, and others being the Loks and the Lis from Dongguan. The village was originally called Chan Lok Li Tsuen.

Tung Tau Tsuen is part of the Tung Tau alliance or "Joint Meeting Group of Seven Villages", together with Nam Pin Wai, Choi Uk Tsuen, Ying Lung Wai, Shan Pui Tsuen, Wong Uk Tsuen and Tai Wai Tsuen. The Yi Shing Temple in Wong Uk Tsuen is an alliance temple of the Tung Tau Alliance.

Ss. Peter and Paul Church, located at No. 201 Castle Peak Road in Yuen Long, near Shui Pin Tsuen, was originally built in 1925 in Tung Tau Tsuen. It was relocated and rebuilt on the present Castle Peak Road site in 1958.

References

External links

 Delineation of area of existing village Tung Tau Tsuen (Shap Pat Heung) for election of resident representative (2019 to 2022)
 Antiquities Advisory Board. Historic Building Appraisal. Kwun Yam Temple, Tung Tau Tsuen, Yuen Long Pictures
 Antiquities Advisory Board. Pictures of Tin Hau Temple, Tung Tau Tsuen

Villages in Yuen Long District, Hong Kong
Yuen Long
Shap Pat Heung